The Oxford Health Alliance (OxHA) is a charitable organisation based in London, UK, and with a global network of participants. Its aim is to reduce the global impact of the epidemic of four major chronic diseases – diabetes, heart disease, lung diseases and some cancers – which are caused by three risk factors: tobacco use, and poor diet and lack of physical activity that lead to obesity. The four chronic diseases together account for over 50% of deaths in the world.

OxHA enables collaboration between experts and activists from a wide range of disciplines in order to raise awareness and change behaviours, policies and perspectives about the epidemic of chronic disease at every level of society. OxHA advocates and facilitates action and collaboration and encourages research about the risk factors and chronic disease prevention to promote health at local, national and international levels.

OxHA was founded in 2003 under the name Oxford Vision 2020. It was renamed 'the Oxford Health Alliance' in early 2005.

Focus areas

In particular, OxHA focuses on five topics central to the prevention of chronic disease and reducing the risk factors - the organisation's work in these areas promotes translating compelling evidence into practical and actionable solutions. OxHA assembles and promotes evidence in each area, in conjunction with a network of experts and partner organisations.

The economic argument for prevention: the costs of chronic disease are already vast, and without urgent action these costs will continue to increase.
Prevention in the workplace: chronic disease risk reduction in the workplace can have a major impact on the health of employees and their families, while also demonstrating social responsibility and improving productivity.
Youth, children and future health: the insights and enthusiasm of young people can change perceptions and lifestyles of future generations. 
Environmental design for prevention: designers, architects and urban planners can assist in creating an environment in which the healthy choices are the easy choices.
Industry's role in prevention: prevention efforts by companies and industries can have a far-reaching effect on consumers and communities.

3four50.com

In addition, OxHA has launched a new website, an 'open space for health', with the aim of harnessing the social networking power of the internet in order to promote chronic disease prevention. 3four50.com reflects OxHA's message of three risk factors leading to four chronic diseases contributing to more than 50% of deaths worldwide. All of the content on the new site is user-generated, and includes stories, blogs and vlogs (reflecting different cultural perspectives on health and comments/ideas from those wishing to share their views), high-profile guest interviews, photos, and full coverage of the OxHA 2006 Annual Summit.  Through these channels, 3four50 will aim to facilitate communication of health messages in an innovative and compelling way.

Annual Summits
OxHA convenes its members at annual summits to generate ideas, provoke dialogue and stimulate effective action. The first two meetings, held at the University of Oxford in 2003 and 2004, underscored the need for a truly global approach to the challenges of chronic disease, and the third meeting, in Yale, saw the start of OxHA's ‘transition to action’.

The 2006 meeting was held in Cape Town, South Africa on the theme of 'Health in transition: working together'. It gave particular focus to the developing world and to ways in which the alliance can use the technology offered by new media, including the launch of 3four50.com. The event was streamed live and on demand.

References

External links
 Oxford Health Alliance website
 3four50.com website
 World Health Organization website on chronic disease

Medical and health organisations based in London
Health charities in the United Kingdom